Ebenezer Jenckes Penniman (January 11, 1804 – April 12, 1890) was an American politician and United States Representative from the U.S. state of Michigan from 1851 to 1853.

Early life
Born in Lansingburgh, New York, Penniman attended the common schools and was apprenticed as a printer at the age of thirteen in the office of the New Hampshire Sentinel. When he was eighteen years of age, he bought his indenture and moved to New York City in 1822 to pursue a career in the mercantile business.

Career
Later, Penniman moved to Orwell, Vermont, where he engaged in business as a dry-goods merchant.  In 1840, he moved to Plymouth, Michigan and again engaged as a dry-goods merchant. He also served as supervisor of Plymouth Township in 1842, 1843, 1844, and 1850.

Congress 
In 1850, Penniman defeated incumbent Democrat Alexander W. Buel to be elected as a Whig from Michigan's 1st congressional district to the Thirty-second Congress, serving from March 4, 1851 to March 3, 1853.  He was the first Plymouth citizen elected to the United States Congress.  He was not a candidate for renomination in 1852.  

He was a member of the convention that met under the oaks at Jackson, Michigan, July 6, 1854, at the organization of the Republican Party in Michigan.  He was a delegate to 1856 Republican National Convention from Michigan.

Later 
Penniman resumed mercantile pursuits until the First National Bank of Plymouth was organized in November 1871, and he, at the age of 67, was named president.

Death
Penniman died in Plymouth, Wayne County, Michigan, on April 12, 1890 (age 86 years, 91 days). He is interred at Riverside Cemetery, Plymouth, Michigan.

Family life
The son of Chiron and Olive Whipple Penniman, he married Maryette and they had two children, Mary and Julius A. Maryette died in 1843 and he then married Eliza Connor with whom he had three children, Maryette, Ebenezer Julius, and Katrine E.

References

External links
 

The Political Graveyard

 

1804 births
1890 deaths
People from Lansingburgh, New York
Whig Party members of the United States House of Representatives from Michigan
Michigan Republicans
People from Plymouth, Michigan
19th-century American politicians
Burials in Michigan